Sapok Biki (born 9 April 1974) is a Malaysian boxer. He won the gold medal in the light flyweight class at the 1998 Commonwealth Games in Kuala Lumpur. He also competed for his native country at the 1996 Summer Olympics in Atlanta, Georgia. He has since retired from competition and become a coach.
 
He is of Iban descent from Simunjan, Sarawak. He is serving in the Malaysian Army as a Major. Many local people in Sarawak idolised him and entered boxing after watching Sapok Biki won gold during the 1998 Commonwealth Games.

References

External links 
 Sapol Biki on sports-reference.com

Light-flyweight boxers
Malaysian male boxers
Iban people
Boxers at the 1998 Commonwealth Games
Boxers at the 1996 Summer Olympics
Olympic boxers of Malaysia
Commonwealth Games gold medallists for Malaysia
Commonwealth Games medallists in boxing
1974 births
Living people
People from Sarawak
Malaysian military personnel
Southeast Asian Games medalists in boxing
Southeast Asian Games silver medalists for Malaysia
Competitors at the 1999 Southeast Asian Games
Medallists at the 1998 Commonwealth Games